Marietta Historic District may refer to:

Northwest Marietta Historic District, in Marietta, Georgia
 Marietta Historic District (Marietta, Ohio), in the city of Marietta, Washington County, Ohio
 Marietta Historic District (Marietta, Pennsylvania), in the borough of Marietta, Lancaster County, Pennsylvania